Hercus fontinalis is a species of ichneumon wasp in the family Ichneumonidae. It is found in the United States and Europe.

Subspecies
These two subspecies belong to the species Hercus fontinalis:
 Hercus fontinalis flavens Townes & Gupta, 1992 c g
 Hercus fontinalis fontinalis g
Data sources: i = ITIS, c = Catalogue of Life, g = GBIF, b = Bugguide.net

References

Further reading

External links

 

Parasitic wasps
Insects described in 1857